North Crawley is a village and civil parish in the unitary authority area of the City of Milton Keynes, Buckinghamshire, England.   It is located near the border with Bedfordshire, about three and a half miles east of Newport Pagnell.

The village name 'Crawley' is an Old English language word, and means 'clearing frequented by crows'.  In the Domesday Book of 1086 the village was referred to as Crauelai.  In manorial records in 1197 the area was split into Great Crawley and Little Crawley.  The prefix 'North' was added sometime before 1398.  Local speculation has it that the prefix was added to distinguish the village from the town of Crawley in West Sussex but supporting historical evidence remains to be found. The hamlet of Little Crawley still exists under that name.

Anciently North Crawley was the location of a monastery dedicated to Saint Firmin.  The monastery was recorded in the Domesday Book, though had fallen into such decay by the Dissolution of the Monasteries that little notice was taken of it, and it fell into ruin shortly afterwards. The Anglican parish church continues to be dedicated to the saint.

The village has many different societies. They range form the Women's Institute to the Historical Society. There is also North Crawley Cricket Club and North Crawley Bowls Club.

There are two public houses in North Crawley. One named The Cock, the other named The Chequers. There also used to be a third pub named The Castle in North Crawley. All of these are mentioned in the song written about North Crawley named Hasten The Day by Jim Lancaster whilst he was in Burma.

References

External links

Villages in Buckinghamshire
Areas of Milton Keynes
Civil parishes in Buckinghamshire